Selectrix is a digital model train control system developed by German company Döhler & Haas for model railway manufacturer Trix in the early 1980s. Selectrix is based on a communication protocol developed originally by Siemens for communication between mainframe computers.

Döhler & Haas offered their system to several model railway manufacturers in the 1980s. The only manufacturer interested in the system was Trix GmbH; this resulted in a licensing agreement between the two companies giving Trix exclusive marketing rights to the system. In 1999 the two companies mutually agreed to terminate their licensing agreement. Since then, Selectrix has become a widely recognized open standard and is supported by several equipment manufacturers in Europe. Selectrix is especially popular in smaller N scale and Z scale model railways. The MOROP has covered Selectrix data protocols partially in their NEM standards.

Selectrix bus
Selectrix is based on the principle of using one single data bus for controlling everything in a model railway layout including rolling stock and accessories, and carrying feedback from various system components. The data bus is bi-directional and synchronized. This makes it possible to integrate many types of automatic functions in a model railway without a separate control computer and software using only a Selectrix central unit. Because the data packets are being sent out and received within a fixed timeframe, the system speed and reaction times are not dependent of the number of decoders to control, like is the case with other systems, most notably the National Model Railroad Association's Digital Command Control (NMRA-DCC). Selectrix is also very resistant against data communication errors between the central unit and decoders in locomotives or data bus.

Central unit
Bi-directional data bus signal is available in SX bus of the central unit. Standard connectors of SX bus are 5-pin DIN 45500 plugs and sockets. The topology of bus connections is free and Selectrix accessories can be connected together in closed circle, chained or daisy chain style. SX bus accepts any type of Selectrix accessories apart from system boosters. For connecting boosters to the central unit or to each other Selectrix systems have a dedicated PX bus available. SX bus signal of the first SX bus (in case the central unit has more than one SX bus available) is available in the track also and connected through two cables directly from central unit (or booster) to the track.

Control of locomotives
Track signal is unidirectional and communication from a locomotive back to the system central unit is not possible directly. The system allows an indirect connection, however, to report the locomotive decoder ID number back to the central unit (transponding). Transponder functions require a transponding compatible Selectrix locomotive decoder and track occupancy detector, which in addition to the track block occupancy information, reports also the ID of the locomotive(s), found in the monitored track block, back to the SX bus.

Data signal
Data signal of SX bus consists of the contents of all bus memory addresses transmitted sequentially and repeated at constant speed 13 times per second. SX bus has 128 addresses numbered from 0 to 127, each consisting of eight data bits (one byte). The first 112 addresses (0-111) are normally available for controlling the model railway. The remaining 15 addresses (112-127) are reserved for system's internal use. Some central units may use additional data bus addresses for their internal functions.

Response times
Because the system works in constant speed and is synchronized, decoder response times do not depend on the system load. In this respect, Selectrix differs from competing systems, where the response times slow down drastically when the number of locomotives to control increases. For this reason, Selectrix is very suitable for bigger layouts where several trains are operated at same time and especially for computer-based control.

Limits
Controlling a Selectrix locomotive decoder takes one SX address with its eight bits. Therefore, one Selectrix bus can control maximum 112 locomotives simultaneously. If the system central unit is equipped with more than one SX bus, only the first one (SX0) is connected to the track and can be used to control locomotives. In some control throttles, only locomotive addresses 1-99 can be selected. For this reason it is generally a good idea to avoid using addresses above 99 for locomotives.

Control of accessories
If a Selectrix bus address is used to control turnouts, signals or other accessories, one SX bus address can control maximum 8 items. In this case one bit with its two values (0 and 1) in an SX address can correspond to two turnout or signal positions. A typical Selectrix system bus with its 112 bus addresses can therefore control up to 896 switches. Most central units are equipped with at least two data buses, SX0 and SX1. In a multi-bus system, the first data bus, SX0, is commonly used for controlling locomotives only while SX1 and subsequent buses are reserved for accessories.

Occupancy detector
For feedback, an occupancy detector based on current consumption on track or a decoder detecting a closed contact can be connected to a SX bus. Because system decoders can share bus addresses thus allowing decoders to control each other directly through bus synchronization, it is, for instance, quite possible to use an occupancy detector to switch a signal to stop position automatically when there is a train in track block protected by the signal. Some Selectrix occupancy detectors are equipped with transponding capability. They report the ID of the locomotive decoder found in a monitored track block back to the system central unit via SX bus.

Locomotive decoders
Selectrix locomotive decoders have traditionally been quite small in comparison to decoders used in competing systems. For this reason, Selectrix has been a very popular choice in smaller N scale and Z scale model railways. A locomotive decoder has 5 bits reserved for controlling the locomotive speed. This gives 32 speed steps in both directions. Internally, though, most Selectrix decoders use 128 speed steps. In addition to speed control, a Selectrix decoder provides control for locomotive head and rear lights and one additional function. If more functionality is required, there are Selectrix decoders equipped with SUSIbus for an additional sound decoder or similar.

Automatic brake function
Selectrix decoders have an automatic brake function which is activated when a decoder detects an asymmetrical track SX signal (this can be accomplished with a single diode used as a rectifier). This feature can be used to stop trains in front of a red signal automatically, for instance.

Transponding capability
Modern Selectrix decoders have transponding capability where the decoder ID of a locomotive found in certain track block is reported back to the system. Using transponding function requires Selectrix occupancy detectors with transponder capability in track.

Manufacturers
The most important manufacturers of Selectrix equipment are Rautenhaus, Müt-Digirail, Modellbahn Digital Peter Stärz and MTTM. Selectrix components from various manufacturers are compatible at all levels and can be freely combined.

References
http://www.mttm.de

External links
 timeline

Digital model train control
Rail transport modelling